Gina Janssen (born 5 January 1953) is a German former film actress and glamour model. During the 1970s, she starred in a number of sex comedies and also worked with Spanish director Jesús Franco.

Selected filmography
  (1972)
 Penelope Pulls It Off (1975)
 Three Bavarians in Bangkok (1976)
 Schulmädchen-Report 10 (1976)
 All Around Service (1976)
 Tänzerinnen für Tanger (1977)
 Agent 69 in the Sign of Scorpio (1977)
 Inn of the Sinful Daughters (1978)
 She's 19 and Ready (1979)
 Sadomania (1981)

References 

 Variety's Film Reviews: 1978-1980. R.R. Bowker, 1983.

Bibliography 
 Karen A. Ritzenhoff & Karen Randell. Screening the Dark Side of Love: From Euro-Horror to American Cinema. Springer, 2012.

External links 
 

1953 births
Living people
Glamour models
German film actresses
Actresses from Munich